The 2016 FINA Men's Water Polo World League was the 15th edition of the annual men's international water polo tournament. It was played between October 2015 and June 2016 and opened to all men's water polo national teams. After participating in a preliminary round, eight teams qualify to play in a final tournament, called the Super Final in Huizhou, China from 21–26 June 2016.

In the world league, there are specific rules that do not allow matches to end in a draw.  If teams are level at the end of the 4th quarter of any world league match, the match will be decided by a penalty shootout. Teams earn points in the standings in group matches as follows:

 Match won in normal time - 3 points
 Match won in shootout - 2 points
 Match lost in shootout - 1 point
 Match lost in normal time - 0 points

Europe

Preliminary round
The European preliminary round consisted of three group of four teams. The winner of each group after the home and away series of games qualified for the Super Final.

Group A

Group B

Group C

Intercontinental Qualification Tournament

Preliminary round

5th Place

3rd Place

Final

Super Final
In the Super Final the eight qualifying teams are split into two groups of four teams with all teams progressing to the knock-out stage. The games were played in Huizhou, China from 21 to 26 June 2016.

Qualified teams

Group A

Group B

Knockout stage

5th–8th Places

Quarterfinals

5th–8th Places Semifinals

Semifinals

7th Place

5th Place

3rd Place

Final

Final ranking

References

World League, men
FINA Water Polo World League
International water polo competitions hosted by China